Riches may refer to:

 Wealth
 Riches (TV series), British Television drama
 The Riches (television series)
 C. T. Hurry Riches, Locomotive Superintendent of the Rhymney Railway from 1906
 Norman Riches (1883–1975), Welsh cricketer
 Tom Hurry Riches (1846–1911), Locomotive Superintendent of the Taff Vale Railway, 1873–1910
 Riches (album), a 1988 album by Deacon Blue
 Riches & More, a compilation album by Deacon Blue

See also
 Rich (disambiguation)